Bané  is a department or commune of Boulgou Province in eastern Burkina Faso. Its capital lies at the town of Bané. According to the 1996 census the department has a total population of 22,923.

Towns and villages

 Bané (1 095 inhabitants) (capital)
 Bantougri (2 964 inhabitants) 
 Boumbin (732 inhabitants) 
 Dabaré (1 184 inhabitants) 
 Dattou (1 280 inhabitants) 
 Douré (817 inhabitants) 
 Gomin (882 inhabitants) 
 Hortougou (250 inhabitants) 
 Karema (312 inhabitants) 
 Koabgtenga (1 095 inhabitants) 
 Léré (684 inhabitants) 
 Naï (1 168 inhabitants) 
 Nazé (602 inhabitants) 
 Ouâda (5 604 inhabitants) 
 Oumnoghin (2 118 inhabitants) 
 Patin (456 inhabitants) 
 Soadin (670 inhabitants) 
 Toabin (559 inhabitants) 
 Zougbilin (451 inhabitants)

References

Departments of Burkina Faso
Boulgou Province